Brachyopoidea is a superfamily of temnospondyls that lived during the Mesozoic. It contains the families Brachyopidae and Chigutisauridae. The earliest records of brachyopids are from the Lower Triassic in Australia. The latest-surviving member of the superfamily is the chigutisaurid Koolasuchus from the Early Cretaceous of Australia.

Description

However, an unnamed Late Triassic or Early Jurassic brachiopoid from Lesotho in southern Africa is estimated to have been far larger. At an estimated , the brachiopoid from Lesotho is one of the largest amphibians sensu lato ever known. This estimate is based on a single jaw fragment found in 1970 by a French expedition near Alwynskop in Quthing.

Because of its size, the fragment was initially considered to be from a mastodonsaur. However, Several features of the specimen indicate that it is from a brachyopoid. There is a large tusk protruding from the ectopterygoid, a bone of the palate, and the dental morphology is similar to that of other brachyopoids. When viewed from the side, the upper margin of the jaw appears concave. The specimen was redescribed as a brachyopoid in 2005.

Classification
Shown below is a cladogram of Brachyopoidea adapted from Ruta et al. (2007).

Notes

 Amphibians in the most general sense- i.e. terrestrial or semi-terrestrial vertebrates which do not belong to amniota.

References

General references

 
 Marsicano, Claudia A. (2005) A new temnospondyl record from the Upper Triassic of Argentina. Ameghiniana, vol.42, no.2, p. 501-504. ISSN 0002-7014.
 
 
 

Triassic temnospondyls
Jurassic temnospondyls
Cretaceous temnospondyls
Trematosaurs
Amphibian families
Early Triassic first appearances
Early Cretaceous extinctions